Christmann is a German surname. Notable people with the surname include:
 
Anna Christmann (born 1983), German politician
Gunter Christmann (1936–2013), German-born Australian painter
Jakob Christmann (1554–1613), German Orientalist
Karl Christmann (1912–1944), German World War II pilot
Randel Christmann (born 1960), U.S. politician

German-language surnames